Miodrag Bulatović (20 February 1930 – 15 March 1991) was a writer, novelist, journalist and playwright. He is considered to be one of the best Montenegrin novelists and remains the most translated Montenegrin author.

Biography
Bulatović began in 1956 with a book of short stories, Djavoli dolaze ("The Devils Are Coming", translated as Stop the Danube), for which he received the Serbian Writers Union Award. His novel The Red Rooster Flies Heavenwards, set in his homeland of northeastern Montenegro, was translated into more than twenty foreign languages. He then stopped publishing for a time, to protest against interference in his work.

His next novel, Hero on a Donkey, "A dark hot nightmare of a war novel...", was first published abroad and only four years later (1967) in Yugoslavia.

Common themes in his works are demons, evil, grotesque and black humor.

In 1975, Bulatović won the NIN Award for novel of the year for People with Four Fingers, an insight into the émigré's life. The Fifth Finger was a sequel to that book.  His last novel was Gullo Gullo, which brought together various themes from his previous books.

A library in Rakovica is named after him.

Bulatović was known "for his fierce Serbian nationalism, which earned him the enmity of other ethnic groups in Yugoslavia, and he was an official of Serbia's Socialist Party." His candidature for the President of the Association of Writers of Yugoslavia in 1986 was rejected by Slovenian, Kosovan, Montenegrin and Croatian branch of the Association contributing to the subsequent disolution of the Association in 1989.

Works
 Stop the Danube (Djavoli dolaze, 1956)
 The Wolf and the Bell (Vuk i zvono, 1958)
 The Red Rooster Flies Heavenwards (Crveni petao leti prema nebu, 1959) 
 Godot has Arrived (Godo je došao, 1966)
 Hero on a Donkey (Heroj na magarcu, 1967) 
 The War Was Better (Rat je bio bolji, 1968)
 People with Four Fingers (Ljudi sa četiri prsta, 1975)
 The Fifth Finger (Peti prst, 1977)
 Gullo gullo (1981)
 Death's Lover - a series of articles in Politika newspaper (Ljubavnik smrti, 1990)

Notes

References

1930 births
1991 deaths
People from Bijelo Polje
Serbs of Montenegro
Montenegrin writers
Montenegrin male writers
Serbian writers
University of Belgrade Faculty of Philosophy alumni
Burials at Belgrade New Cemetery